John Fry may refer to:

John Fry (16th century MP), MP for Lyme Regis
John Fry (regicide) (1609–1657), English Member of Parliament and a judge at the trial of Charles I
John Fry (record producer) (1944–2014), founder of Ardent Records
John Fry (businessman) (born 1944), co-founder of Fry's Electronics and its current president
John Fry (cricketer) (born 1961), former English cricketer
John Wesley Fry (1876–1946), politician in Alberta, Canada and a former mayor of Edmonton
John Anderson Fry (born 1960), president of Drexel University and former president of Franklin & Marshall College
Johnny Fry (1840–1863), first "official" westbound rider of the Pony Express
John Franklin Fry, character in Revolution (TV series)
John Hemming Fry (1861–1946), American painter
John Fry (journalist) (1930–2020), Canadian journalist specialized in outdoor recreation and travel

See also
Jack Frye (1904–1959), aviation pioneer